Campoli del Monte Taburno is a comune (municipality) in the Province of Benevento in the Italian region Campania, located about 45 km northeast of Naples and about 11 km west of Benevento.

Campoli del Monte Taburno borders the following municipalities: Apollosa, Castelpoto, Cautano, Montesarchio, Tocco Caudio, Vitulano.

References

Cities and towns in Campania